Abu Talib is a kunya, meaning "father of Talib". It may refer to:

 Abu Talib ibn Abd al-Muttalib (549–619), Arab leader and head of the Banu Hashim clan
 Abu Talib al-Makki (died 996), Muslim scholar, jurist and mystic
 Abu Talib Yahya (951–1033), Zaydi imam 
 Abu Talib Rustam (997–1029), Buyid emir of Ray, Iran
 Mirza Abu Taleb Khan (1752–1805/6), Indo-Persian administrator famous for his travelogue about Europe
 Sufi Abu Taleb (1925–2008), President of Egypt
 Fat'hi Abu Taleb (1933–2016), Jordanian army field marshal
 Abu Talib (musician) (1939–2009), American blues musician
 Yousef Abu-Taleb (born 1980), American actor
 Muhammad Jailani Abu Talib (born 1985), Singaporean poet, editor and writer